Matthias Hoogen (June 25, 1904 – July 13, 1985) was a German politician of the Christian Democratic Union (CDU) and former member of the German Bundestag.

Life 
In 1945 Hoogen participated in the refoundation of the centre. Shortly before the 1949 federal elections, he joined the CDU.

Hoogen was a member of the Economic Council of Bizone in 1948/49. He was a member of the German Bundestag from its first election in 1949 to 1964 and represented the constituency of Kempen-Krefeld in parliament as a member of parliament who was always directly elected.

Literature

References

1904 births
1985 deaths
Military Ombudspersons in Germany
Members of the Bundestag for North Rhine-Westphalia
Members of the Bundestag 1961–1965
Members of the Bundestag 1957–1961
Members of the Bundestag 1953–1957
Members of the Bundestag 1949–1953
Members of the Bundestag for the Christian Democratic Union of Germany